The Rauniyar is a Hindu caste mostly found in Nepal and India.  They are also known as Rauniyar, Roniyar, and Roniaur, they use Rauniyar, Gupta, Mahajan, Sah, Shah, Anand, Ranjan, Kashyap, Rauniwal as their surnames. 

In Nepal, the Rauniyar or Roniaur live in Terai region mainly in Eastern Part, however, they are also found in other Terai regions as well as the Indra Chowk area of Kathmandu. They use Gupta, Shah, Sah or simply Rauniyar as their surname. Most of the Rauniyars who are Nepalese citizens do not change their surname. Various clans in the community don't necessarily share common beliefs. They speak Nepali, Bhojpuri and Maithili. Their main occupations are Business, jagirdar and are involved in different Jobs in various sectors.

In India, the Rauniyar call themselves as Namnihar. They claim to have come from Awadh some three hundred years. They are found throughout Magadh, Muzaffarpur, East Champaran, West Champaran, Munger, Bhagalpur, Nawada, Gaya and Odisha. Their common surnames are Shaw, Sah, Shah, Gupta, Keshri and Rauniyar also. They are strictly endogamous and practice clan exogamy. The Roniaur speak Maithili in northeast Uttar Pradesh, Bhojpuri in western Bihar and commonly speak Hindi.

Origin 

Several theories have been placed forward speculating the origin of the term 'Rauniyar'. One theory connects the origin of the term to 'Vikramaditya' Hemu who was a Rauniyar Vaish. Apparently around mid 1500's Hemu lost his battle with Akbar. Samrat Hem Chandra Vikramaditya, Hemu Vikramaditya or simply Hemu (Hindi: सम्राट हेम चंद्र विक्रमादित्य) (1501–1556) was a Hindu Emperor of India during the sixteenth century, in medieval times. This was one of the crucial periods in Indian history, when the Mughals and Afghans were desperately vying for power.
Noted literary figure and one of the greatest publishers of his time Acharya Ramlochan Saran was also a Rauniyar. He was the direct descendent of the last Hindu emperor of India - Hemu. Many of his surviving relatives live in Whole India ,Nepal and Aborad like United States of America, Britain, Russia & Others.

Present circumstances 

The Rauniyar are divided into three territorial groupings, the Purbia, Panchnaha and Bail Kuchnaha. Marriages within each of these groups aren't a common practice. They are further divided into several exogamous clans.  Their traditional occupation has been in the business of textiles and food grains. A few Rauniyar are jagirdars, but they rarely ever cultivated their own land, depending on sharecroppers. Their customs are similar to other Awadh Bania, such as the Omar.   

The Rauniyar can be found as traders, landowners, entrepreneurs, large-scale business owners, consultants, and shopkeepers. Many used to be substantial jagirdars, but the land reforms carried out after independence in 1947 and seen a break up of the larger estates. Like other Bania communities, they are undergoing urbanization. Many rural Raniaur are village shopkeepers and money lenders. They have a statewide caste association, the Raniaur Mahasabha, which acts both as an instrument of social control as well as a communal welfare association.

They are present in almost the entire India and trying to create bonding amongst themselves

People 
 Darshan Rauniyar: American politician and Businessman.
 Chhote Lal Rauniyar: Fundamental Analyst and Advisor of Nepal stock market, Former President at Nepal Investment Forum.
 Deepak Rauniyar: Nepalese director, writer, and producer.

References 

Social groups of Uttar Pradesh
Indian castes